Kilar may refer to
Wojciech Kilar, Polish composer of classical and film music
Qerekhlar, a village in Iran
Kilar,  a village in Uttara Kannada district, Karnataka, India.
Killar,  a village Himachal Pradesh, India.

See also